L'Ennui is a 1998 erotic drama film directed by Cédric Kahn from a screenplay he co-wrote with Laurence Ferreira Barbosa, based on the 1960 novel La noia by Alberto Moravia. The film stars Charles Berling, Sophie Guillemin and Arielle Dombasle, with Robert Kramer, Alice Grey and Maurice Antoni. It follows the life of a bored philosopher as he becomes jealously obsessed with the much younger lover of a dead painter.

Cast
 Charles Berling as Martin
 Sophie Guillemin as Cécilia
 Arielle Dombasle as Sophie
 Robert Kramer as Meyers
 Alice Grey as Cécilia's mother
 Maurice Antoni as Cécilia's father
 Philippe Rebbot as waiter at Momo's cafe

See also
 The Empty Canvas (1963)

References

External links
 
 

1998 films
1998 drama films
1990s erotic drama films
1990s French-language films
Films based on Italian novels
Films based on works by Alberto Moravia
Films directed by Cédric Kahn
Films produced by Paulo Branco
Films set in Paris
Films shot in Paris
French erotic drama films
Juvenile sexuality in films
Louis Delluc Prize winners
Portuguese drama films
1990s French films